Temple Beth-El, formerly known as the Broad Street Synagogue, is a historic Jewish synagogue at 688 Broad Street in Providence, Rhode Island, United States.

History
The congregation was founded in 1849 when an Orthodox group known as the "Sons of Israel" gathered for daily services in Providence.  In 1877, the congregation affiliated itself with the Union of American Hebrew Congregations (later becoming the Union for Reform Judaism), the national Reform Judaism denomination. While Newport, Rhode Island had a well-established Sephardi Jewish community since the 17th century, few Sephardi Jews lived in Providence. The Jews of Providence who founded Temple Beth-El were predominantly Ashkenazi Jews from German-speaking areas. The majority of the early congregants were immigrants from Germany, the Netherlands, Hungary, and Poland.

The building was built in 1910-1911 and was the home of Sons of Israel (becoming known as "Temple Beth-El") until 1954. In 1954, Temple Beth-El moved to a new building on the East Side of Providence, with the old building serving as home to the Shaare Zedek congregation. In 2006, Shaare Zedek merged with Beth Shalom, and the Broad Street building was left vacant.

Due in part to the housing crash of 2008, Beth Shalom was unable to sell the building, and it became neglected and vandalized. In 2014, a developer purchased the building and the nonprofit Friends of Broad Street Synagogue was organized to turn the building into a community center.

The Building
The current building, a Classical Revival brick structure, was designed by Banning & Thornton and built in 1910–11.

Architect Ira Rakatansky designed renovations to the building in 1955. An iron fence was added to separate the synagogue from Broad Street in 1984. The building was added to the National Register of Historic Places in 1988.

The old building, vacant since 2006, suffered severe vandalism and water damage. It has been named one of Providence's "Most Endangered Buildings" by the Providence Preservation Society eight times.

See also
National Register of Historic Places listings in Providence, Rhode Island

References

External links
Temple Beth-El website
Broad Street Synagogue website

Former synagogues in the United States
Synagogues in Rhode Island
Buildings and structures in Providence, Rhode Island
Ashkenazi synagogues
Orthodox synagogues in the United States
Reform synagogues in Rhode Island
National Register of Historic Places in Providence, Rhode Island
Synagogues on the National Register of Historic Places in Rhode Island
Ashkenazi Jewish culture in the United States
Dutch-Jewish culture in the United States
European American culture in Rhode Island
German-Jewish culture in the United States
Hungarian-Jewish culture in the United States
Polish-American culture in Rhode Island
Polish-Jewish culture in the United States
Religious organizations established in 1849
1849 establishments in Rhode Island
1910s architecture in the United States
Neoclassical architecture in Rhode Island
Neoclassical synagogues
Synagogues completed in 1911